The Abbot of Evesham was the head of Evesham Abbey, a Benedictine monastery in Worcestershire founded in the Anglo-Saxon era of English history. The succession continued until the dissolution of the monastery in 1540.

List

Notes

References
 

 
 

Evesham
Abbot of Evesham
Evesham Abbey